Susana Chou Vaz da Luz  (born 2 December 1941), also known as Chou Kei-jan and Cao Qizhen, is a Macau politician who served as the President of the Legislative Assembly of Macau from 1999 to 2009.

Biography
Chou's ancestral hometown is the current Yinzhou District of the city of Ningbo in China's Zhejiang Province. Chou was born in Shanghai on 2 December 1941, and is the oldest daughter of Chao Kuang Piu, who was an industrial tycoon in Shanghai. While her father moved in Hong Kong after 1949, Chou remained in China until 1968 when she moved to Macau.

Chou studied physics and majored in radio technology at the Anhui University. Chou also studied French language and literature in Paris.

Politics
In 1976, Chou participated in Portuguese Macau's first direct election of the Legislative Assembly, and was successful in the election. From 1984 to 1999, she served in the third, fourth, fifth and sixth sessions of Portuguese Macau's Legislative Assembly.

After the transfer of sovereignty of Macau from Portugal to China in 1999, Chou was elected as the President of new Legislative Assembly for its first, second and third sessions. Her stress on efficiency and effectiveness, while praised by the government, in many ways curtailed policy debate and discussion with little public consultation.

Election results

Honors and awards
 1983, The Commander Degree of the Medal of Agriculture and Industrial Merit, by the President of the Portuguese Republic
 1994, The Medal of the Knight of National Order of Merit, by the President of the French Republic
 1994, The Medal of Industrial and Commercial Merit, by the Governor of Macau
 1999, The Medal of Bravery, by the Governor of Macau
 1999, The Grand Cross of the Order of Merit, by the President of the Portuguese Republic
 2002, The Chevalier of the Legion of Honor, by the President of the French Republic
 2003, The Grand Lotus Medal of Honour, by the Chief Executive of Macau
 2007, The Officer of the Legion of Honor, by the President of the French Republic

Extra information

 ChinaVitae: CV of Susana Chou (English)
 MacauNews: Brief biography of Susana Chou (English)

References

1941 births
Living people
Macau businesspeople
Politicians from Shanghai
Members of the Legislative Assembly of Macau
Macau women in politics
Officiers of the Légion d'honneur
Businesspeople from Shanghai
Macau women in business
20th-century Macau people
21st-century Macau people
Chou family
Anhui University alumni